Greenboard may refer to 
 a green-colored blackboard
 green colored drywall (in contrast to normal drywall suitable for damp places like kitchen or bathroom)